Soleymanabad (also Romanized as Soleymānābād) is a village in Safa Khaneh Rural District, in the Central District of Shahin Dezh County, West Azerbaijan Province, Iran. At the 2006 census, its population was 422, in 90 families.

References 

Populated places in Shahin Dezh County